Kevin Bernard Robinzine (born April 12, 1966 in Fort Worth, Texas) was a 1988 Olympic gold medalist in the men's 4×400 meter relay for the United States, where he ran the third leg. The team equalled the world and Olympic record from 1968 in Mexico with 2:56.16.

References

 

Sportspeople from Fort Worth, Texas
Track and field athletes from Texas
American male sprinters
Pan American Games gold medalists for the United States
Athletes (track and field) at the 1987 Pan American Games
Athletes (track and field) at the 1988 Summer Olympics
Olympic gold medalists for the United States in track and field
1966 births
Living people
Pan American Games medalists in athletics (track and field)
Medalists at the 1988 Summer Olympics
Universiade medalists in athletics (track and field)
Universiade gold medalists for the United States
Medalists at the 1987 Summer Universiade
Medalists at the 1987 Pan American Games